Hernando L. Planells (born November 4, 1976) is an American basketball coach. He is a former associate head coach of Duke Blue Devils women's basketball, former assistant coach of the Maine Red Claws of the NBA Development League and former head coach of the Basketball Japan League (BJ) team Ryukyu Golden Kings. Planells has coached at the high school, college and professional ranks. He has also choreographed basketball action in movies and commercials.  He was also the head coach of the Bouncers Slamball team.

Early life and family 
Planells was born in Los Angeles to mother, Carmen Waga-Pangan from Cagayan de Oro, Philippines, and father, Hernando Sr. from Spain.

Coaching career 

Planells has one of the most diverse backgrounds in basketball in both coaching and player development. He has coached at every level including a stint with the Maine Red Claws from 2010-11 of the NBA Development League. Planells has also spoken at coaching clinics and conducts player development camps all over the United States and in countries such as Japan, Philippines, Australia, Switzerland and Taiwan. In 2011, he founded ELITE athlete training, which specialized in personal training and consulting services for athletes. Through his work with ELITE, he trained and assisted over 100 athletes reach their goal of gaining a college scholarship or playing professionally.

From 2005-10, Planells served as a scout for Marty Blake, who is the Director of Scouting for the NBA. In his role as a scout, Planells put together scouting reports evaluating NBA prospects which were circulated to every NBA general manager and player personnel director.

In 2008, Planells returned to the United States after serving as head coach of the Ryukyu Golden Kings, an expansion team that is a part of the BJ League (Basketball Japan). For the 2006-07 season, he served as the head basketball coach for The Hollywood Fame, a team that participated in the American Basketball Association (ABA).

In 2005, Planells was named the first head coach of the Wyoming Golden Eagles out of the All-American Professional Basketball League. At that time, the 28-year-old was the youngest professional basketball coach in the country.

In 2020, Planells was named head coach of the women's basketball team for William Jessup University.

Slamball coaching record

Head coaching record in Japan

|- 
| style="text-align:left;"|Ryukyu Golden Kings
| style="text-align:left;"|2007-08
| 44||10||34|||| style="text-align:center;"|5th in Western|||-||-||-||
| style="text-align:center;"|-
|-

Film credits 
Planells' experience and background has allowed him to be a basketball choreographer for Reelsports Solutions, on motion pictures. He choreographed the basketball scenes and trained the actors on movies and commercials.

In 2001 Planells, also known as Coach "H," was named the head coach for the Bouncers on TV SPIKE TV's smash hit SLAMBALL. His two-year run with the Bouncers saw them qualify for the playoffs, lead the league in scoring and being voted the most "exciting team in Slamball". In 2004–2005 he was hired to train the athletes of "Extreme Dodgeball", the highest rated show on the Game Show Network.

In 2006 Planells teamed up with Radiant Pictures and choreographed a Japanese basketball commercial featuring Japanese Basketball superstar Yuta Tabuse for Nissay Insurance.
 Planells has also choreographed the basketball scenes and trained the actors in "Coach Carter" starring Samuel L. Jackson.
 Choreographed the basketball scenes and trained the actors in "The Longest Yard" starring Adam Sandler.
 Choreographed the basketball scenes and trained the actors in "Rebound" starring Martin Lawrence.
 Choreographed the basketball scenes and trained the actors in "Spider-Man 3" starring Tobey Maguire.
 Choreographed the basketball scenes and trained the actors in "License to Wed" starring Robin Williams.
 Choreographed the basketball scenes and trained the actors in Semi-Pro starring Will Ferrell.

References 

1976 births
Living people
American Basketball Association (2000–present) coaches
American expatriate basketball people in Japan
American men's basketball coaches
American people of Spanish descent
American sportspeople of Filipino descent
Basketball coaches from California
Basketball players from Los Angeles
Citrus Owls men's basketball coaches
Maine Red Claws coaches
High school basketball coaches in the United States
Ryukyu Golden Kings coaches
UNLV Runnin' Rebels basketball coaches